Aforia trilix is a species of sea snail, a marine gastropod mollusk in the family Cochlespiridae.

Description
(Original description) The high, very narrow shell has a biconically fusiform shape. It is subscalar, bicarinated, strong, white. The axial sculpture shows very many unequal, strong, harsh, flexuous lines of growth, of which one every here and there is stronger than the rest. The spiral sculpture shows two keels, of which the upper and stronger lies a little above the middle of the whorls, is sharply pinched out, but has a rounded edge. There is a drooping, but straight-lined shoulder above, and the whorl is somewhat contracted below it, so that it has considerable prominence. T;he lower keel is a rounded, rather prominent thread, which is the more conspicuous from the contraction of the whorl below it into the suture. Between these two keels, more or less in the middle, lies a thread, which is more marked than any of the others which, coarse, unequal, and interrupted, closely cover the whole surface. Of these two or three in the line of the sinus on the shoulder, between the upper keel and the suture, are somewhat stronger, more regular, and swollen than the rest. While just below this point, where the lines marking the lower edge of the sinus run, the surface is almost free of spiral threads.

The colour of the shell is a porcellanous white. The epidermis is extremely thin, smooth, pale yellowish.

The spire is high, narrow, subscalar. The apex consists of 1¼ embryonic whorls, globose, smooth, and somewhat obliquely pressed down on one side at the extreme point. The 7½ whorls are narrow, angulated, with a straight drooping shoulder below the suture, slightly concave between the keels, contracted into the lower suture. The base is conical, and projects on the right side into a long, narrow, and very slightly twisted snout. The suture a fine, sharp, deeply impressed line. The aperture is club-shaped, being oval above, with a sharpish angulation at the upper point, and being prolonged into a long, rather
narrow, but slightly widening siphonal canal, which is open in consequence of the oblique cutting away of the columellar lip. The outer lip, which is thin, sharp, and patulous, with a slight contraction on the edge of the siphonal canal, leaves the body nearly at a right angle, and advances with a very slight convexity to the keel, above which lies the deep, thin-lipped, U-shaped sinus, whose lower margin lies parallel to, but a little above, the conical thread From the keel the lip has an edge which on the front is first convex and then very slightly receding, while on the side it is first convex and then concave to the point of the snout, where its course is very straight. The columellar lip is a thin porcellaneous glaze, spreads a little on the body, from which the spirals are slightly cut away. The lip is a little concave above, then straight, and is early and obliquely cut away on the front of the columella, where it is slightly prominent, and finally it runs out to the point of the snout as a thin edge bordering the siphonal canal.

Distribution
This species is found in the Southern Indian Ocean between Kerguelen and Heard Island.

References

External links
  Griffiths, H.J.; Linse, K.; Crame, J.A. (2003). SOMBASE - Southern Ocean mollusc database: a tool for biogeographic analysis in diversity and evolution. Organisms Diversity and Evolution. 3: 207–213

trilix
Gastropods described in 1881